Datok Keramat is a state constituency in Penang, Malaysia, that has been represented in the Penang State Legislative Assembly since 1974. It covers a part of George Town proper, including the eponymous urban district colloquially known as Dato Keramat.

The state constituency was first contested in 1974 and is mandated to return a single Assemblyman to the Penang State Legislative Assembly under the first-past-the-post voting system. , the State Assemblyman for Sungai Pinang is Jagdeep Singh Deo from the Democratic Action Party (DAP), which is part of the state's ruling coalition, Pakatan Harapan (PH).

Definition

Polling districts 
According to the federal gazette issued on 30 March 2018, the Datok Keramat constituency is divided into 9 polling districts.

This state seat encompasses the western part of George Town's city centre, including much of Dato Keramat Road, from where the constituency got its name. Also located within the Datok Keramat seat are some of the city's major landmarks and institutions, such as the City Stadium, Penang Free School and The Residency, the latter of which is the official residence of the governor of Penang.

The Datok Keramat state constituency is bounded to the north by Western Road (now Jalan Utama) and Dato Keramat Road. However, it stops just short of Penang Times Square, which comes under the neighbouring Komtar constituency. To the south, the constituency extends up to Free School Road just south of Penang Free School, thus covering the residential area around the historic school and east of Green Lane. Both Green Lane and Scotland Road also form the constituency's western limits.

Demographics

History

Election results 
The electoral results for the Datok Keramat state constituency in 2008, 2013 and 2018 are as follows.

See also 
 Constituencies of Penang

References 

Penang state constituencies